The 2018 Korea Masters (officially known as Victor Korea Masters 2018 for sponsorship reasons) was a badminton tournament which took place at Gwangju Women’s University Stadium in South Korea from 27 November to 2 December 2018 and had a total prize of $250,000 (₩282,744,600).

Tournament
The 2018 Korea Masters was the twenty-sixth and last tournament of the 2018 BWF World Tour before the 2018 BWF World Tour Finals. However, this tournament was not calculated in the rankings used as qualification for the World Tour Finals. It was part of the Korea Masters, which had been held since 2007. It was organized by the Badminton Korea Association and sanctioned by the BWF.

Venue
This international tournament was held at the Gwangju Women’s University Stadium in Gwangju, South Korea.

Point distribution
Below is the point distribution table for each phase of the tournament based on the BWF points system for the BWF World Tour Super 300 event.

Prize money
The total prize money for this year's tournament was US$250,000. Distribution of prize money was in accordance with BWF regulations.

Men's singles

Seeds

 Son Wan-ho (champion)
 Anthony Sinisuka Ginting (withdrew)
 Tommy Sugiarto (withdrew)
 Jonatan Christie (withdrew)
 Khosit Phetpradab (second round)
 Kantaphon Wangcharoen (withdrew)
 Suppanyu Avihingsanon (first round)
 Lee Dong-keun (second round)

Finals

Top half

Section 1

Section 2

Bottom half

Section 3

Section 4

Women's singles

Seeds

 Ratchanok Intanon (withdrew)
 Sung Ji-hyun (second round)
 Nitchaon Jindapol (quarter-finals)
 Gregoria Mariska Tunjung (first round)
 Pornpawee Chochuwong (withdrew)
 Busanan Ongbamrungphan (second round)
 Goh Jin Wei (semi-finals)
 Han Yue (final)

Finals

Top half

Section 1

Section 2

Bottom half

Section 3

Section 4

Men's doubles

Seeds

 Fajar Alfian / Muhammad Rian Ardianto (first round)
 Han Chengkai / Zhou Haodong (withdrew)
 Goh V Shem / Tan Wee Kiong (second round)
 Mohammad Ahsan / Hendra Setiawan (withdrew)
 Berry Angriawan / Hardianto (quarter-finals)
 Aaron Chia / Soh Wooi Yik (quarter-finals)
 Lu Ching-yao / Yang Po-han (semi-finals)
 Po Li-wei / Wang Chi-lin (final)

Finals

Top half

Section 1

Section 2

Bottom half

Section 3

Section 4

Women's doubles

Seeds

 Jongkolphan Kititharakul / Rawinda Prajongjai (withdrew)
 Lee So-hee / Shin Seung-chan (final)
 Chang Ye-na / Jung Kyung-eun (champions)
 Chayanit Chaladchalam / Phataimas Muenwong (quarter-finals)
 Baek Ha-na / Kim Hye-rin (semi-finals)
 Ng Tsz Yau / Yuen Sin Ying (first round)
 Hsu Ya-ching / Hu Ling-fang (second round)
 Kim Hye-jeong / Kong Hee-yong (quarter-finals)

Finals

Top half

Section 1

Section 2

Bottom half

Section 3

Section 4

Mixed doubles

Seeds

 Praveen Jordan / Melati Daeva Oktavianti (semi-finals)
 Seo Seung-jae / Chae Yoo-jung (withdrew)
 Chen Tang Jie / Peck Yen Wei (second round)
 Rinov Rivaldy / Pitha Haningtyas Mentari (second round)
 Alfian Eko Prasetya / Marsheilla Gischa Islami (first round)
 Lu Kai / Chen Lu (quarter-finals)
 Tontowi Ahmad / Della Destiara Haris (withdrew)
 Akbar Bintang Cahyono / Winny Oktavina Kandow (quarter-finals)

Finals

Top half

Section 1

Section 2

Bottom half

Section 3

Section 4

References

External links
 Tournament Link

Korea Masters
Korea Masters
Korea Masters
Korea Masters
Korea Masters